Rohrgraben may refer to:

Rohrgraben (Werra), a river of Thuringia, Germany, tributary of the Werra
Rohrgraben (Aisch), a river of Bavaria, Germany, tributary of the Aisch